The Mixed 5 km Team Relay competition at the 2017 World Championships was held on 20 July 2017.

Results
The race was started at 10:00.

References

Team
World Aquatics Championships